is a Japanese singer, actress, and tarento. Her stage name was  when she was in the Takarazuka Revue.

She grew up in Kunitachi, Tokyo. Haida is represented with Toho Entertainment and later Horipro.

Filmography

Stage

During Takarazuka

After Takarazuka

Concerts

Mini concerts and handshake meetings

Events

In-store concerts

TV series

Regular appearances

Voice acting

Dramas

Films

Japanese dub

Advertisements

Books

Magazines

Discography

Albums

Singles

DVD

Others

References

External links
 
Musical Academy: Dream 

Japanese stage actresses
Japanese entertainers
Pony Canyon artists
1979 births
Living people
Singers from Tokyo
People from Kunitachi, Tokyo
People from Tachikawa
21st-century Japanese actresses
21st-century Japanese singers
21st-century Japanese women singers